The Laguna Lakeshore Expressway Dike is a proposed expressway in the Philippines that will start from the coastal area of Laguna de Bay from Taguig in Metro Manila to Calamba and Los Baños in Laguna.

The project also involve reclamation of 700 hectares west of and abutting the expressway-dike, separated from the shoreline by a 100–150 meter channel in Taguig and Muntinlupa.

The project aims to provide a high-standard highway that will speed up traffic between the southern part of Metro Manila and Laguna, as well as a dike that would mitigate flooding in the western coastal communities along Laguna Lake.

The expressway will cost an estimated PHP36.74 billion or US$854.42 million. When constructed, it is expected to ease traffic congestion along Muntinlupa and Calamba area, and to serve as flood control measure for communities on the western shore of Laguna de Bay.

Proposed route
The route alignment starts from Bicutan, Taguig connecting to the proposed C-6 Expressway Road Project. It traverses southwards passing the city boundaries of Taguig, Parañaque and Muntinlupa in the southern part of Metro Manila and then continues further south passing the cities of San Pedro, Biñan, Santa Rosa, Cabuyao, Calamba and ends up at Los Baños in Laguna, near its boundary with Bay.

The construction of the expressway dike is proposed to involve two sections:
 from Bicutan to Calamba; and
 from Calamba to Los Baños.

Proposed parallel eastern shore projects 
While the expressway dike hopes to alleviate flooding on the southwestern shore of Laguna de Bay, officials and planners have acknowledged that there is still a need to cope with the excess water volume in the lake itself, with urban planner Felino Palafox describing the situation as "like having a toilet without a flush."

As the expressway dike would alleviate flooding in the more metropolitan western shore of the lake, similar projects have been proposed which would prevent the additional water volume from causing larger-scale flooding on the eastern shore, which includes the coastal towns of Rizal province and of eastern Laguna Province.

These projects include the construction of a "Pacific spillway" from the lake to the east coast of Luzon, which would drain excess water from the eastern part of the lake; and the construction of the revamped Laiban Dam and Kaliwa Low Dams in Tanay, Rizal, which is projected to reduce the water flowing into the northeastern portion of the lake.

However, construction of the Pacific Spillway has been identified by the DPWH as a low priority, while the construction of the Tanay dams has been controversial, such that only the construction of the Kaliwa Low Dam has been approved as of the second quarter of 2014.

Pacific spillway proposal 
The project most directly intended to prevent the water volume displaced by the expressway dike from causing larger-scale flooding on the eastern shore of the lake is the construction of a 20 Kilometer "Pacific spillway." This would take the form of either a tunnel or an open canal which would begin at the eastern shore of Laguna de Bay, cross the Sierra Mountains, and release water into the Pacific Ocean somewhere along the shore of Infanta.

In an August 23 interview with GMA News TV's News to Go, Laguna Lake Development Authority General Manager Nereus Acosta said that the government would be pursuing this project in place of the 1970s Parañaque spillway proposal, which had first been brought up in connection with the Manggahan Floodway project.

However, in a separate interview the day before, August 22, Public Works and Highways Secretary Rogelio Singson told abs-cbnnews.com that the construction of the Pacific spillway would be assigned the lowest priority because it may no longer be necessary if the controversial New Centennial Water Source-Kaliwa Dam Project (NCWSP) and its later full implementation to include Laiban Dam push through:
"'Yung mas priority doon iyong road-ring dike. 'Yung Pacific spillway e 'yun 'yung nasa last priority dahil 'pag nagawa na 'yung flood dam doon sa itaas ng Sierra Madre, ang tingin namin iyong tubig sa lawa e hindi ganung kasing taas ng nangyayari ngayon. So you might not need the Pacific spillway." (The road-ring dike is the higher priority.  The pacific spillway, that has least priority because when the flood dam up in the Sierra Madre [mountain range] gets finished, we don't think the water in the lake will go up as much as it used to.  So you might not need the pacific spillway.)

Kaliwa Low Dam and Laiban Dam proposals 

The already-existing proposals for the construction of Laiban Dam and Kaliwa Low Dam in Tanay, Rizal have also been associated with the eastern shore aspect of the Laguna Lakeshore Expressway Dike, with  Public Works and Highways Secretary Rogelio Singson indicating that these projects, if fully implemented, might reduce the need for the pacific spillway project.

The construction of the dams has been controversial, however.  Earlier attempts to construct a large dam in Tanay's Barangay Laiban, have raised concerns among various stakeholders because of its potential environmental impact and the because it would affect the ancestral lands of the Remontado Dumagat people.

Due in part to these controversies, a new proposal, billed the "New Centennial Water Source Project", was created, with two lower capacity dams instead of the original large-capacity Laiban dam.  The larger of the new proposed dams would retain the name "Laiban Dam", while a lower capacity dam downstream would be named the "Kaliwa Low Dam."  Project costs and concerns about the larger dam further led to the project being split into stages, and today only the lower capacity Kaliwa Low Dam has been approved by the NEDA Investment Coordination Committee.

Other related projects

Calamba-Los Baños Expressway 

Aside from the Laguna Lakeshore Expressway Dike, another project, the Calamba-Los Baños Expressway had earlier been proposed by the government, slated to begin construction some time in "Mid 2014–2017."  Often confused with the Expressway Dike Project, the Calamba-Los Baños Expressway instead exits from the South Luzon Expressway at its Santo Tomas exit in Calamba, passing through the coastal areas of Calamba and Los Baños and ending in Bay, whereas the Dike project passes through reclaimed areas on the Laguna Lake itself.

Approval Process

August 2012 Monsoon Floods and Initial Conception 
The idea of "a dike around Laguna" to serve as "a flood-control system meant to protect flood-prone areas along Laguna Lake" was first seriously raised in 2012, in reaction to the damage wrought by the 2012 Metro Manila Monsoon Floods.  The Department of Public Works and Highways (DPWH) was tasked to take on the project.

Early response from activist groups 
Early opposition to the project, upon its suggestion in 2012, mostly focused on the displacement of fisherfolk from the shores of Laguna de Bay, and on the fact that large corporations would benefit so much from the reclamation, with activist fisherfolk groups like PAMALAKAYA (the National Federation of Small Fisherfolk Organization in the Philippines) protesting the construction of "high-rise condominium buildings, big-budget housing units, world-class hotels and ecotourism centers in areas which will be vacated by the lake-shore families.".

PAMALAKAYA also expressed skepticism regarding the intent of the project, saying they had doubts such a project would really solve flooding in Metro Manila and low-lying areas around the lake, or provide a major water catchbasin catering to the business needs of water and electric utilities.

August 2013 Typhoon Maring and public announcement of "road-ring dike" 
In the aftermath of the floods brought about by Typhoon Maring in August 2013, President Benigno Aquino III made plans for the dike project public.

Media outlets referred to the proposal as a "megadike" but Public Works Secretary Rogelio Singson corrected this saying that it was to be called a "road-ring dike." Singson also said that they did not have a timeline for the project yet,as they were still completing the feasibility study and coming up with a detailed design of the project.

There was some controversy about whether or not the dike had indeed been a government priority prior to the 2013 floods.  The government had released the Flood Management Master Plan for Metro Manila and Surrounding Areas in June that year, and the announcement had not included the dike as one of the "11 recommended shortlisted structural mitigation measures", listing it merely as an "optimum solution in solving the flooding situation in the Laguna lake-shore area."

Proposed Project Financing 
President Aquino also said in the vernacular that "the best part [of the road dike project] is that it can be self-financing, ", explaining that the dike may be financed through reclamation:
"Ang proposal nung proponent is dahil may mare-reclaim nga ang bayad sa kanila something like a third of the reclaimed area mababayaran na yung combination dike and road that will open up a lot of areas around Laguna leading to development." (The proposal of the propinent is that since there is reclamation to be done, the payment to them could just be something like a third of the reclaimed area.  That would pay for the combination dike and road that will open up a lot of areas around Laguna leading to development.)

In an interview the following day, Nereus Acosta announced in another interview that the project fell under Public-Private-Partnership program for the C-6 Extension, while in another interview, Public Works Secretary Rogelio Singson said the dike could be built under a "built-operate-transfer" scheme, meaning that the project would be financed and operated by a private agency for a period not exceeding 50 years, after which it would be taken over by the government.

May 2014 rejection due to environmental impact questions 
The Expressway Dike Project was initially slated for approval by the National Economic and Development Authority (NEDA) in its May 29, 2014 Board meeting, with the inter-agency Investment Coordination Committee of the National Economic and Development Authority (NEDA-ICC) endorsing the project for final approval by the board.

It was initially rejected at that meeting, however, when some of the board members had questions about some of the environmental and technical aspects of the project.

The DPWH later announced that it would make the "necessary clarification" regarding the project's environmental impact, specifying that concerns raised in the meeting had included "the height of the dike, the construction of water circulation, the separation between the low-lying communities and the new islands that would be created as part of the reclamation, the establishment of pumping stations, among others."  The department indicated that they hoped to get final approval for the project and be able to bid the project out "toward the end of 2014 or in the first quarter of 2015"

June 2014 Approval 
In June 2014, the Expressway Dike Project was finally green-lighted for implementation.

The NEDA board deferred on the project again during their June 2, 2014 meeting, requesting the DPWH to prepare and submit materials to be presented at the June 19 meeting, specifying the DPWH's responses to specific questions raised by the NEDA board.

The project was finally approved during the June 19, 2014 board meeting, in which the board also approved the operation and maintenance of the Bohol Airport and of Laguindingan Airport in Misamis Oriental.  At P123-billion, this made the Expressway Dike the biggest PPP project under the administration of President Aquino.

Public-Private Partnership Center Cosette Canilao told Reuters that the auction process "will start within the next quarter."

Construction of the expressway dike was then slated to begin in "late 2015" and to finish in 2021.

On July 28, 2014, President Aquino cited the expressway dike in his 5th State of the Nation Address as one of the infrastructure projects approved by his administration as part of its disaster preparedness efforts.

Bidding Process
Cosette Canilao, Public-Private Partnership (PPP) Center executive director, identified the 14 companies that bought bid documents as of August 18, 2014:

Metro Pacific Investments Corp,
Ayala Land Inc,
San Miguel Corp,
Megaworld Corp,
Filinvest Land Inc;
GT Capital Holdings Inc (Metrobank),
LT (Lucio Tan) Group Inc,
Leighton Contractors (Philippines),
Egis Group,
Minerales Industrias Corp, and
Muhibbah Engineering (M) Bhd,
Minerales Industrias Corp,
JP Power and Wealth Corp,
Macquarie Capital Securities, and
Laguna Lakeshore Consortium (with D.M. Wenceslao and Associates, Inc.’s Delfin J. Wenceslao as chairman);

See also
Laguna de Bay
Major roads in Metro Manila
Highways in the Philippines
List of Expressways in the Philippines
Metro Manila Dream Plan
South Luzon Expressway
Calamba-Los Baños Expressway
Laguna Lake Development Authority
New Centennial Water Source-Kaliwa Dam Project
Proposed Dams in the Kaliwa River watershed

References

External links 
 Department of Public Works and Highways
 The Official Site Public-Private Partnership Center of the Philippines

Proposed roads in the Philippines
Roads in Metro Manila
Roads in Laguna (province)
Laguna de Bay
Toll roads in the Philippines